Lưu Quang Minh (18 May 1988) was a writer and singer from Vietnam. He became famous when his very first book 'Gia tai tuoi 20' was published in Vietnam and became popular. He also composed and sang his debut song 'Gia tai tuoi 20' based on the stories from his book. Since then, he has begun working as a writer and singer. His music always based on his stories, he called that: ‘The Interference Of Music And Literature’.

Biography
Minh was born on 18 May 1988 in Ho Chi Minh City, Vietnam. He studied Graphic Design, Industrial Art at here. He is now living in Ho Chi Minh City. He began writing stories when he was 16, 17 years old.

His very first story 'Co don tren mang' was written in 2007 and published on 'Women Sunday Magazine'. Later, this story became famous in Internet, introduced Minh to readers.

His first book 'Gia tai tuoi 20' was published in March 2010 with 20 stories. This book quickly became popular and famous in Vietnam.

Continued writing stories, Minh also composed and sang his songs. The songs always based on and had the same name of the stories, which he called: ‘The Interference Of Music And Literature’.

He now continues working in music & literature. He has the YouTube Channel named Lưu Quang Minh & also a TikToker.

Works

Stories
 Co don tren mang
 Gia truoc tuoi
 Tho Ragu

Books
 Gia tai tuoi 20 (3/2010)

Songs
 Gia tai tuoi 20
 Hoa Tra My
 Con meo den
 Dan ong di cho
 Tieng lanh canh va nhung o cua so sang den

References

External links
Official Website

21st-century Vietnamese male singers
Vietnamese writers
1988 births
2015 deaths